Imaginarium SA is a Spanish company that operates a chain of toy stores. It sells various toys comprising wheel, furniture, and child care toys to various customers, including educational institutions, such as schools, nurseries, or playgroups. The company operates 348 outlets in 28 countries. Imaginarium SA was incorporated in 1992 and is headquartered in Zaragoza, Spain.

Toy companies of Spain
Companies established in 1992
1992 establishments in Spain